Cornelia "Connie" September (born 26 June 1959, Cape Town) is a retired South African politician that served as Minister of Human Settlements from 2013–2014.

Early life  
September grew up on the West Coast where her mother would send her for holidays. She worked as clothing factory worker in Salt River with little interest in politics or trade unions, though she began her political activism here in the trade union and labour movement.

References

1959 births
Living people
People from Cape Town
Members of the National Assembly of South Africa
African National Congress politicians
Women government ministers of South Africa
Women members of the National Assembly of South Africa